Amber Mariano (born October 18, 1995) is an American politician serving in the Florida House of Representatives. A member of the Florida Republican Party, she was first elected to the Florida legislature in 2016 while still a student at the University of Central Florida. At 21, she was the youngest representative ever elected. She was reelected in 2018.

She is the daughter of Jack Mariano, a Pasco County Commissioner.

Elections

Mariano ran a campaign centered around higher education and local flooding issues. Her campaign featured endorsements from then-Governor Rick Scott and U.S. Senator Marco Rubio. In November she defeated incumbent Democratic Representative Amanda Murphy. She won 50.5% to 49.5%, or by roughly 719 votes. This made her the youngest representative elected to the Florida House.

She was re-elected comfortably in 2018- 58.8% to 41.2%.

Age

Rep. Mariano has been open about the challenges of running for office at a young age. She was profiled in Cosmopolitan, where she spoke about the issues she faced while campaigning. She recalled how members of her opponent's team negatively engaged with her at polling locations, making comments on how she had not yet graduated and demeaningly calling her "little girl".

In her re-election effort in 2018, her opponent Linda Jack called her a nice person who "was still too young to have this job". She went on to defeat Jack by more than 17 points.

References

External links
Florida House of Representatives - Amber Mariano

Women state legislators in Florida
Living people
University of Central Florida alumni
People from Hudson, Florida
1995 births
21st-century American politicians
21st-century American women politicians
Republican Party members of the Florida House of Representatives